Future of Congo (ACO) is a political party in the Democratic Republic of the Congo. They hold 12 seats on the National Assembly.

The current Prime Minister Jean-Michel Sama Lukonde is from the party.

See also 
 Liberal parties by country

References 

Political parties in the Democratic Republic of the Congo
Liberal parties in Africa